Lin Fangling (born 25 February 2001) is a Chinese badminton player. Lin started to play badminton from the young age of 5, and went to Shanghai sports school aged 9 to receive advanced training. With her various achievements at the junior level, she was selected in the Shanghai badminton team in 2013 and afterwards in National team in 2017. She won 2 gold medals in 2019 World junior championships, one in girls' doubles & another in mixed doubles. She was also the silver medalist in the same year's Asian junior championships in mixed doubles category.

Achievements

World Junior Championships 
Girls' doubles

Mixed doubles

Asian Junior Championships 
Girls' doubles

Mixed doubles

BWF Junior International (2 titles, 3 runners-up) 
Girls' doubles

Mixed doubles

  BWF Junior International Grand Prix tournament
  BWF Junior International Challenge tournament
  BWF Junior International Series tournament
  BWF Junior Future Series tournament

References

External links 

2001 births
Living people
Badminton players from Hainan
Chinese female badminton players
21st-century Chinese women